The  is one of the two minor leagues ("ni-gun") of Japanese professional baseball. The league is owned and managed by the Pacific League of Nippon Professional Baseball (NPB). 

The league traces its roots to the Kansai Farm League, a formerly independent baseball league outside the realm of the NPB. It formerly included 7 teams, which quickly transformed into 6 due to the disbandment of once famous ballclub Sanyo Crowns. The first farm teams or second armies joined the league for the 1955 season. 

A league champion is determined at the end of each season. The Hanshin Tigers have won 18 Western League titles, the most in the league's history, followed by the Chunichi Dragons (16) and the SoftBank hawks (12).

Structure and season 
The league is currently based on a round robin system with at most 33 games against each other team in the league, which allows second armies to play a maximum of 132 games per year, including interleague games with the Eastern league (japanese baseball). The number of scheduled games will vary from team to team, and games that are cancelled will not be replaced. The league championship is thus decided on winning percentage.

Interleague play
Interleague play exists. Interleague play is played in May during the Miyazaki Sunshine Series (宮崎サンシャインシリーズ). Plus, the WL champion meets the Eastern league's champion in the Farm Japan Championship Game, a single game to determine an overall champion of farm baseball, which has been held annually since 1987.

Teams

History

Kansai Farm League 
The league was created in 1952 as the Kansai Farm League, and was initially completely separate from the workings of the Nippon Professional Baseball. It featured the minor league teams of the six professional teams that had their homefields in the western region of Japan, as well one independent team not affiliated with an NPB franchise.

The initial complement of teams:
 Hankyu Braves
 Hanshin Jaguars
 Nagoya Dragons
 Nankai Hawks
 Nishitetsu Lions
 Sanyo Crowns — independent
 Shochiku Robins

The Sanyo Crowns were dissolved after the 1952 season. The Shochiku Robins merged with the Taiyo Whales in 1953, but the Kintetsu Pearls' farm team joined the league that year, keeping the number of teams at six.

In 1954 the six teams of Nippon Professional Baseball's Central League decided to form their own minor league, called the New Japan League. With the Chunichi Dragons and Hanshin Tigers affiliates dropping out to join the new minor league, only four teams remained in the Kansai Farm League.

Formation of the Western League 
Both minor league decided to join forces with NPB in 1955, and the 14 farm teams of the Central League and Pacific League were split up to create the Western League and Eastern League, each with seven teams.

1955 Western League lineup (minor league homefield shown in parentheses):
 Chunichi Dragons (Nagoya, Aichi)
 Hankyu Braves (Kobe, Hyōgo)
 Hanshin Jaguars (Nishinomiya, Hyōgo)
 Hiroshima Greens (Iwakuni, Yamaguchi)
 Kintetsu Pearls
 Nankai Hawks (Fukuoka, Fukuoka)
 Nishitetsu Lions

Shrinkage 
The Lions moved their franchise to Saitama in 1979 to join the Eastern League, leaving six teams, and in 2005 the Orix BlueWave and Osaka Kintetsu Buffaloes merged to become the Orix Buffaloes, leaving five teams in the Western League.

Format History 

Until 2002, the tournament was played 18 times per year (9 home and 9 visitor (H&A) games each) and 90 games per season. In 2003 and 2004, the tournament was divided into two stages, with the 18 times per year (9 H&A games each) divided into 9 stages (4 or 5 stages depending on the game played). The final match was held in October between the teams with the highest winning percentage in each stage (one game system: home game of the team that finished first in the previous season).

In 2005, the previous/previous season system was abolished, and the tournament was reverted to a one-season system of 22 round-robin matches (11 each for H&A) and 88 games between five teams. Thereafter, the number of rounds was changed to 104 games with 26 rounds (13 each in H&A), which continued until the 2014 season. From 2011 to 2014, the number of round-robin games with the five teams in the Western League was maintained at 104 games, including round-robin games with the five teams in the Eastern League, and the number of games with the five teams in the Eastern League was changed from 26 to 104 (13 H&A games each). The ranking is based on the results of all games (including the Miyazaki Sunshine Series in May), including interleague games with teams in the Eastern League, in order of winning percentage because the number of games differs from team to team. Unlike the official games of the first team, games canceled due to rain were sometimes held at the visiting team's home stadium.

From 2015, the number of games will be a maximum of 33 games per card for each of the five teams (a maximum of 132 games per team), including interchange games with the Eastern League. The number of scheduled games will vary from team to team, and games that are cancelled will not be replaced.

Of the five teams, when a game is hosted by a team whose first team belongs to the Pacific League (Orix and SoftBank), a designated hitter system (DH system) will be adopted. Conversely, when a game is hosted by a Central League team (Chunichi, Hanshin, or Hiroshima Toyo), a nine-hitter system was used for all games until 2012, but the DH system has been used for games hosted by Hanshin since 2013 and by Chunichi since 2015. The DH system can also be used in games hosted by Hiroshima Toyo starting in 2015, but each team can decide whether or not to adopt the system.

In principle, extra innings are limited to 10 innings. However, in the case of a preliminary game held at the same venue as an official game of the first team, or in the case of a regional game held at a different venue the next day, extra innings are not played after two and a half or three hours (depending on the venue) from the start of the game. Even if the score is tied in the final inning or the home team wins the game with the visiting team leading, the game will always end when the attack in that inning is completed, not in the middle of the inning. Even if time expires before the fifth inning is completed, the game shall always be played until the fifth inning.

In addition, a tournament has been held in May every year since 1961, in which all teams participate and the tournament is held at a neutral site (the 29th tournament in 1986 through the 40th tournament in 1997 were added to the official round-robin tournament).

In addition, a few pro-am exchange tournaments are held during the season between teams that are not scheduled to play and teams from the Japan Baseball Federation.

References

External links 
 Western League standings from 1955–2011 (Japanese)

2
3
Sports leagues established in 1952
1952 establishments in Japan
Professional sports leagues in Japan